Five Times Five is a 1939 American short documentary film directed by Frank P. Donovan. It was nominated for an Academy Award at the 12th Academy Awards in 1940 for Best Live Action Short Film, Two-Reel. The Dionne quintuplets have a private five-years-old birthday party in their garden.

Cast
 Alexander Woollcott as Commentary
 The Dionne quintuplets (Annette, Cecile, Emile, Yvonne and Marie)
 Allan R. Dafoe (as Dr. Roy Dafoe) as Quintuplets' doctor

References

External links

1939 films
1939 documentary films
1930s short documentary films
Black-and-white documentary films
Documentary films about children
Multiple births
RKO Pictures short films
Films shot in Ontario
1939 in Canada
Films about birthdays
American short documentary films
American black-and-white films
Quintuplets
1930s English-language films
1930s American films